Nereo Champagne (born 20 January 1985) is an Argentine footballer who plays for Spanish club Rayo Majadahonda as a goalkeeper.

Club career
Born in Salto, Buenos Aires, Champagne joined San Lorenzo's youth setup in 2001 from hometown side Club Sport Salto. On 9 December 2007, he made his first team – and Primera División – debut, starting in a 4–1 home routing of Gimnasia Jujuy. A backup to Agustín Orion, he only contributed with three appearances during the campaign.

After mainly featuring with the reserves in the following years, Champagne was loaned to Primera B Nacional club Ferro Carril Oeste on 1 July 2010. An undisputed starter for the side, he only missed only one league match during the season.

Returning to Ciclón in 2011, Champagne was initially a backup to Pablo Migliore, but started to feature more regularly after the latter's injury. On 11 July 2012 he moved to Club Olimpo, with Matías Ibáñez moving in the opposite direction on loan.

Champagne immediately became a first-choice for the club, achieving a top tier promotion in his first season. He featured in 158 matches during his five-year spell.

On 3 January 2017, Champagne was loaned to La Liga side CD Leganés until the end of the season. He made his debut in the category five days later, starting in a 0–2 away loss against Real Betis.

On 5 July 2018, Champagne signed a two-year deal with Real Oviedo in Segunda División.

International career
Champagne was a part of the Argentina under-20 squad for the 2005 FIFA World Youth Championship, but acted as an understudy to Óscar Ustari.

Honours

International
Argentina U20
FIFA U-20 World Cup: 2005

References

External links

1985 births
Living people
People from Salto Partido
People from Buenos Aires Province
Argentine people of French descent
Argentine footballers
Association football goalkeepers
Argentine Primera División players
Primera Nacional players
San Lorenzo de Almagro footballers
Ferro Carril Oeste footballers
Olimpo footballers
La Liga players
Segunda División players
Segunda División B players
CD Leganés players
Real Oviedo players
Real Murcia players
Argentine expatriate footballers
Argentine expatriate sportspeople in Spain
Expatriate footballers in Spain
Argentina under-20 international footballers
Sportspeople from Buenos Aires Province